Israel competed at the 2019 World Aquatics Championships in Gwangju, South Korea from 12 to 28 July.

Artistic swimming

Israel entered 10 artistic swimmers.

Women

 Legend: (R) = Reserve Athlete

Open water swimming

Israel qualified three male and two female open water swimmers.

Men

Women

Mixed

Swimming

Israel entered 11 swimmers.

Men

Women

Mixed

References

World Aquatics Championships
2019
Nations at the 2019 World Aquatics Championships